Kamil Stachyra (born 23 May 1987) is a Polish footballer who plays as a midfielder. He formerly played for Górnik Łęczna, Flota Świnoujście, Stal Rzeszów, Motor Lublin, and  JKS 1909 Jarosław.

Career
Stachyra began his career at KS Lublinianka. On 12 August 2006, he made his debut in professional football as a part of the Górnik Łęczna squad. On 10 October 2013, it was announced that Stachyra had signed with II liga side Motor Lublin.

In August 2017, Stachyra moved to JKS 1909 Jarosław.

References

External links
 

1987 births
Living people
Polish footballers
Sportspeople from Lublin
Association football midfielders
KS Lublinianka players
Motor Lublin players
Górnik Łęczna players
Flota Świnoujście players
Chełmianka Chełm players
Ekstraklasa players
Stal Rzeszów players